Scott Beale (born May 30, 1968 in Dayton, OH) is a New York City based cultural curator, photographer, documentarian and social media expert who founded Laughing Squid, a blog about art, culture and technology and a web hosting company.

Projects

Documentary Films

Beale produced two documentary films, Alonso G. Smith, A Half Century of Social Surrealism (1995) about San Francisco Bay Area surrealist painter Alonso Smith and You’d Better Watch Out: Portland Santacon ’96 (1997) about the SantaCon event in Portland, OR organized by the San Francisco Cacophony Society in 1996.

Laughing Squid

In 1995, Beale started Laughing Squid in San Francisco as a film and video company. In 1996 he launched The Squid List, an art and culture list for the San Francisco Bay Area, that was inspired by experiences he had with the Cacophony Society and Burning Man. In 1998 he launched the web hosting company Laughing Squid Web Hosting followed by the launch of the Laughing Squid blog in 2003. In 2013 he became a member of the Executive Academy of judges for The Webby Awards.

Photography

Beginning in the 1990s, Beale has been actively documenting a variety of underground and countercultural activities and tech events in the Bay Area and all over the world. Examples are images and videos of art groups and events like SantaCon, Survival Research Labs, Cacophony Society, RE/Search, monochrom, XOXO, ROFLcon, FooCamp, Burning Man and Maker Faire.

References

External links
 Laughing Squid
 Scott Beale's Personal site

American male bloggers
American bloggers
American art curators
1968 births
Living people
Writers from the San Francisco Bay Area